The 2017–18 Clemson Tigers men's basketball team represented Clemson University during the 2017–18 NCAA Division I men's basketball season. Led by eighth-year head coach Brad Brownell, the Tigers played their home games at Littlejohn Coliseum in Clemson, South Carolina as members of the Atlantic Coast Conference. They finished the season 25–10, 11–7 in ACC play to finish in four-way tie for third place. They defeated Boston College in the quarterfinals of the ACC tournament before losing in the semifinals to Virginia. They received an at-large bid to the NCAA tournament where they defeated New Mexico State and Auburn to advance to the Sweet Sixteen where they lost to Kansas. The Tigers 25 wins tied the most in program history and their 11 conference wins were the most in program history at the time.

Previous season
The Tigers finished the 2016–17 season 17–16, 6–12 in ACC play to finish in 12th place. They lost in the second round of the ACC tournament to Duke. They received an invitation to the National Invitation Tournament where they lost in the first round to Oakland.

Offseason 
On June 19, 2017, the Tigers announced the signing of Antonio Reynolds-Dean as an assistant coach. Dean replaces longtime assistant Mike Winiecki, who left the program in April.

Departures

Incoming transfers

2017 recruiting class

2018 recruiting class

Roster

Schedule and results

|-
!colspan=12 style=| Exhibition

|-
!colspan=12 style=| Non-conference regular season

|-
!colspan=12 style=| ACC regular season

|-
!colspan=12 style=| ACC tournament

|-
!colspan=12 style=| NCAA tournament

Rankings

*AP does not release post-NCAA tournament rankings

See also
2017–18 Clemson Tigers women's basketball team

References

Clemson Tigers men's basketball seasons
Clemson
Clemson